Kurochkin is a Russian masculine surname, its feminine counterpart is Kurochkina. It may refer to
Evgeny Kurochkin (1940–2011), Russian paleornithologist
 Kirill Kurochkin (born 1988), Russian football player
Nikolai Kurochkin (1830–1884), Russian poet, editor, translator and essayist
Olesya Kurochkina (born 1983), Russian football striker
 Pavel Kurochkin (1900–1989), Soviet general
Vasily Kurochkin (1831–1875), Russian satirical poet, journalist and translator
Victoria Kurochkina (born 1992), Russian water polo player
Vladimir Kurochkin (1829–1885), Russian dramatist, translator, editor and publisher

See also
Kurochkin Strait